Free Ride is a 2013 American crime drama film produced by and starring Anna Paquin. It was written and directed by Shana Betz (aka Shana Sosin), and is based on her childhood in Fort Lauderdale. The film premiered at the 2013 Hamptons International Film Festival.

Synopsis 

Set in the late 1970s, Christina (Paquin) is a single mother from Ohio who escapes her abusive partner, along with her two daughters; teenaged MJ (Liberato) and seven-year-old Shell (Acres). She moves to the Florida coast where she meets up with a friend (De Matteo) who gets her a job in drug smuggling. But Christina must meet the challenges of protecting and providing for her children, with her oldest daughter being more defiant and the hazards of her occupation.

Cast 
 Anna Paquin as Christina
 Drea de Matteo as Sandy
 Cam Gigandet as Ray
 Liana Liberato as MJ
 Yvette Yates as Gia
 J. LaRose as DEA
 John Kapelos as Guardian
 Brit Morgan as Rain
 Lloyd Owen as The Captain
 Jeff Hephner as Bossman
 Ava Acres as Shell
 Kyle T. Heffner as Duane
 Eddie Pepitone as BK

Production

Filming locations for the film included various sites throughout Sarasota County, Florida (including Venice and Englewood).

Release
Free Ride premiered at the 2013 Hamptons International Film Festival on 11 October 2013.

Free Ride opened the 28th Fort Lauderdale International Film Festival (FLiFF) on 18 October 2013.

Free Ride had a limited theatrical release on 10 January 2014.

Reaction

Awards
For directing Free Ride, the inaugural Tangerine Entertainment Juice Award (honoring an outstanding female filmmaker) was given to Shana Betz at the 2013 Hamptons International Film Festival.

Critical response
Free Ride has received negative reviews. Film review aggregator Rotten Tomatoes reports that 14% of critics gave the film a positive review based on 7 reviews, with an average score of 3.9/10. On Metacritic, which assigns a rating out of 100 based on reviews from critics, the film has a score of 41 based on 9 reviews, considered to be "mixed or average".

Writing for The Hollywood Reporter, John DeFore said the film was "[a] loving portrait of a mother many would say deserves a much more critical eye".

Stephen Holden of The New York Times writes that "[f]rom top to bottom, [the story] feels authentic, and its laid-back, nonjudgmental tone evokes the easygoing world of Jimmy Buffett songs celebrating how changes in latitude bring changes in attitude. Much of the movie seems bathed in the pink-grapefruit haze of a Florida sunset. [...] Free Ride offers an unsettling vision of a demimonde whose inhabitants live with the reality that there may be no tomorrow."

Diego Costa of Slant Magazine gave the film two out of four stars, and commented that "Paquin's believable performance keeps the all-too-neat narrative from completely surrendering to cheesy melodrama, and Betz's script is refreshingly devoid of embellishment or poetic ambition. But the filmmaker's too-insistent refusal to commit to the melodramatic or to the suspenseful only makes Free Ride seem like empty dramatization in the end."

Elizabeth Weitzman of New York Daily News gave the film two out of five stars, commenting that Betz was "unable to do the story justice as either a writer or director. [...] While this true-life odyssey should be the basis for a compelling drama or even a taut thriller, slack direction and a weak screenplay undermine the plot’s inherent tension." Weitzman thought Paquin was miscast and "never settles into the role."

References

External links 
 
 
 

2013 films
2013 crime drama films
2013 crime thriller films
2013 independent films
American crime drama films
American crime thriller films
American independent films
Drama films based on actual events
Films about the illegal drug trade
Films scored by Jeff Russo
Films set in Florida
Films shot in Florida
Phase 4 Films films
2010s English-language films
2010s American films